American Marxism is a 2021 book by Mark Levin, a conservative radio host in the United States. The book is a New York Times bestseller and sold 700,000 in its first three weeks of publication.

References 

2021 non-fiction books
Books about Marxism